Margarette Faye Riggins Leach (December 4, 1926 – December 23, 2007) was a United States Democratic politician from West Virginia, best known for being a faithless elector during the 1988 United States presidential election.

She pledged to vote for Michael Dukakis for President of the United States and Lloyd Bentsen for Vice President of the United States. However, she cast her vote for Bentsen as President and Dukakis as Vice President as a form of protest against the electoral college's winner-take-all system.

Leach was later a seven-term member of the West Virginia House of Delegates, representing the 15th district. She won the Democratic primary for an additional term, but lost the general election in 2006.

Leach died December 23, 2007.

References

External links

1926 births
2007 deaths
Faithless electors
Democratic Party members of the West Virginia House of Delegates
Politicians from Huntington, West Virginia
People from Mercer County, West Virginia
Women state legislators in West Virginia
20th-century American politicians
20th-century American women politicians
21st-century American politicians
21st-century American women politicians
1988 United States presidential electors